The Mexican professional wrestling promotion International Wrestling Revolution Group (IWRG) held two events in 2012 under the name Caravana de Campeones ("Caravan of Champions") for the first time since they started holding the Caravana de Campeones in 2008. IWRG held one shown May and the other in August under the same banner. As the name indicates the events center around the various championships promoted by IWRG. The May event had three championships defended and the August featured five championship matches in total.

The May show featured a tournament for the IWRG Intercontinental Middleweight Championship, having been declared vacant in 2012 after the championship had been inactive for four years prior to the show. They held an eight-man tournament won by Oficial AK-47, who became the 30th overall middleweight championship. The May show also featured a match for a non-IWRG championship as Eterno defended the WWS World Welterweight Championship, a title that originated outside of IWRG. The May show also had both the IWRG Intercontinental Lightweight Championship and the IWRG Intercontinental Middleweight Championship successfully defended.

The August version of the Caravana de Campeones featured only championship matches, five in total, and saw the WWS World Welterweight Championship change hands as Golden Magic defeated Eterno to win the championship. Also on the show El Hijo de Pirata Morgan defeated Oficial Factor to win the IWRG Rey del Ring Championship. Furthermore, the IWRG Junior de Juniors Championship, the IWRG Intercontinental Heavyweight Championship and the Distrito Federal Trios Championship were successfully defended by the respective champions.

2012 Shows
Caravana de Campeones (May 2012)
Caravana de Campeones (August 2012)

References

External links 
IWRG official website

2012 in professional wrestling
2012 in Mexico
2012